Marinilla is a town and municipality in the Colombian department of Antioquia. It is part of the subregion of Eastern Antioquia.

References

Municipalities of Antioquia Department